The Martin MS-1 was an experimental scout biplane ordered by the United States Navy and was intended to operate from a submarine. It first flew in 1923 and the type was used for tests until 1926 when the project was cancelled.

Development
Following World War I, the U.S. Navy Bureau of Aeronautics conducted studies concerning the possibility of submarine-borne observation and scouting aircraft. After surfacing, this plane should be rolled out and quickly assembled. It was planned to launch the seaplane by ballasting the submarine until the deck was awash. The Navy ordered two types of aircraft, the Martin MS-1, constructed of wood and fabric, and the all-metal Cox-Klemin XS. The MS-1 first flew from Lake Erie in early 1923.

Operational history
The submarine S-1 became the experimental platform for the operation of scout seaplanes late in 1923. The MS-1 and the Cox-Klemin XS were used for the trials, mounted in a cylindrical pod behind the conning tower. The first successful attempt was made on 5 November 1923. The first full cycle of surfacing, assembly, launching, retrieving, disassembly, and submergence took place on 28 July 1926, on the Thames River at New London, Connecticut using the XS-2.

A total of six Martin MS-1s were built, with all six still being listed with the U.S. Navy as late as 1926. After further trials during 1926, all the experimental aircraft were scrapped.

Variants

MS-1
six built (BuNo A6521-A6526).

Operators

 United States Navy

Specifications

See also

References

Bibliography

External links

 The MS-1 on USS S-1
 Aeroweb
 MS-1 photos

MS
1920s United States military reconnaissance aircraft
Floatplanes
Single-engined tractor aircraft
Biplanes
Submarine-borne aircraft
Aircraft first flown in 1923